Funktion Junction is a 1976 album by American trumpeter Blue Mitchell. It was his last album released by RCA Records.

Track listing
"I'm In Heaven" (Mervin Steals)  5:37	
"AM-FM Blues" (Blue Mitchell)  4:21
"Then Came You" (Phillip Pugh, Sherman Marshall)  4:52	
"Daydream" (Billy Strayhorn, Duke Ellington, John LaTouche)  4:45	
"Love Machine" (Billy Griffin, Pete Moore)   7:19
"Delilah" (Victor Young)  8:11	
"Collaborations" (Blue Mitchell)  5:15

Personnel
Blue Mitchell - trumpet, flugelhorn
James Gadson - drums
Henry Davis, Ron Brown - bass
David T. Walker, Michael Anthony - guitar
Mike Lipskin - synthesizer, percussion
Clarence McDonald - piano
Gary Coleman - percussion
Harold Land - tenor saxophone
Wayne Andre, Alan Raph - trombone
David Moore - cello
George Young - tenor saxophone, flute
John Gatchell, Jon Faddis - trumpet, flugelhorn
Alvin Rogers, Harold Kohon, Norman Carr - violin
Frank Floyd, Gwendolyn Guthrie, Patti Austin - backing vocals

Charts

External links
 Blue Mitchell-Funktion Junction at Discogs

References

1976 albums
Blue Mitchell albums
RCA Records albums